Nurabad (also Romanized as Nūrābād and Noor Abad) is a village in Howmeh-ye Gharbi Rural District, in the Central District of Izeh County, Khuzestan Province, Iran. At the 2006 census, its population was 1,631, in 310 families.

References 

Populated places in Izeh County